Frans Brands (31 May 1940 in Berendrecht – 9 February 2008 in Blankenberge) was a Belgian professional road bicycle racer. Brands won a stage in the 1963 Tour de France and in the 1965 Giro d'Italia, and was the winner of the 1967 Tour de Luxembourg.

Major results

1961
Rummen
1963
Tour de France:
Winner stage 18
1964
München - Zürich
Pléneour-Lanver
GP Stad Vilvoorde
Sint-Amandsberg
Omloop Hageland-Zuiderkempen
Zellik
Kapellen
1965
Roosendaal
Giro d'Italia:
Winner stage 8
Stabroek
Sint-Lenaerts
Bilzen
Ossendrecht
Nationale Sluitingsprijs
Tour de France:
8th place overall classification
1966
Omloop van West-Brabant
Polder-Kempen
Visé
Essen
1967
Omloop der drie Proviniciën
De Pinte
Tour de Luxembourg
Auvelais
1968
Nokere Koerse
Herenthout
Oud-Turnhout
Buggenhout
Nationale Sluitingsprijs
1969
Mortsel
Houtem
1970
Belsele - Puivelde
Sint-Kwintens-Lennik
Wilrijk
1971
Antwerpen

External links 

Official Tour de France results for Frans Brands

Belgian male cyclists
1940 births
2008 deaths
Belgian Tour de France stage winners
Belgian Giro d'Italia stage winners
Cyclists from Antwerp